Hymenobacter latericoloratus  is a Gram-negative, rod-shaped, aerobic and non-motile bacterium from the genus of Hymenobacter which has been isolated from freshwater sediments from the Jiuxiang tourist cave from Yunnan in China.

References

External links
Type strain of Hymenobacter latericoloratus at BacDive -  the Bacterial Diversity Metadatabase	

latericoloratus
Bacteria described in 2015